Fusanosuke (written: 房之助 or 房之介) is a masculine Japanese given name. Notable people with the name include:

, Japanese soldier and amputee
, Japanese businessman and politician
, Japanese writer and cartoonist

Japanese masculine given names